Rishi Raj (born 21 July 1943) is an Indian university professor at the University of Colorado Boulder, and the pioneer of flash sintering technology and research.

Academic background 
Raj left India at the age of eighteen after completing a two years program in mathematics, chemistry and physics at Allahabad University. He proceeded to the University of Durham in England where he obtained a bachelor of science degree in Electrical Engineering with First Class Honors.

In 1965, Raj commenced his doctoral studies at Harvard University and obtained a Ph.D in Applied Sciences in 1970 under the mentorship of Michael F. Ashby  and David Turnbull

Career 
Rishi worked briefly at Standard Telephones and Cables (1964-1965) as a Staff Engineer, where he worked on Concorde control systems. Immediately after his doctoral studies, Rishi Raj joined Chase Brass and Copper Company in Cleveland  worked there for a year before joining the University of Colorado Boulder as an assistant professor of Mechanical Engineering. He thereafter moved to the Materials Science Department at Cornell University in 1976. Raj returned to the Department of Mechanical Engineering at the University of Colorado Boulder in 1996 after spending 21 years at Cornell University.

Academic publications 

Raj has published significantly in ceramics, first on their mechanical properties, and the processing of oxides and non-oxides at high temperature. His work at Boulder has been focused on the unusual properties and nanostructure of polymer-derived-ceramics and influence of electric fields on defects phenomena in ceramics at high temperature. In 2010, Raj and his students - Marco Cologna and Boriana Rashkova - discovered the flash sintering technology which has been applied to different materials including  ceramics, oxides, semiconductors, electronic conductors, ionic conductors and insulators. Rishi Raj has been cited more than 26 000 times and has contributed more than 500 academic publications to knowledge. Few of the notable publications of Rishi Raj include:
 On grain boundary sliding and diffusional creep
 Intergranular Fracture at Elevated Temperature
 Creep in polycrystalline aggregates by matter transport through a liquid phase
 Development of a processing map for use in warm-forming and hot-forming processes
 Joule Heating during flash sintering 
 Flash‐sintering of cubic yttria‐stabilized zirconia at 750° C for possible use in SOFC manufacturing

Flash sintering discovery 
Raj and his students first published a work on flash sintering in the Journal of the American Ceramic Society where they showed that yttrium-stabilized zirconia can be sintered in a few seconds at a furnace temperature of ~850 °C to full density. The advantage of this technique over other  sintering techniques is the short time to achieve full density and the lower furnace temperature. Since its publication, flash sintering   it has garnered over 657 citations funded by government agencies, private organizations and academic institutions all over the world. Flash sintering has been described as  “the most significant discovery in the field of Ceramics over the last twenty-five years, with both scientific and technological implications for the coming decades”. It has been commercialized by Lucideon Limited since 2012

References 

Indian materials scientists
University of Colorado Boulder faculty
Harvard University alumni
Alumni of Durham University
University of Allahabad alumni
1943 births
Living people